Alabat Island is an island of the Philippine archipelago, in the Quezon Province of the Calabarzon region, situated just off the east coast of Southern Luzon. The highest peak is called Mt. Camagong.

Alabat Island comprises three municipalities: Perez in the northern tip, Alabat town proper in the center and Quezon in the south. The first inhabitants of the island were the indigenous Inagta Alabat people who are Negritos, the earliest settlers in the Philippines. The indigenous people spoke the Inagta Alabat language, one of the most endangered languages in the world.

The island is located in the Lamon Bay and (33 km long) has an extensive mangrove fringe along its southwest shore, with several hundred hectares of intertidal mudflats exposed at low tide. Large portions of the original mangrove forest have been degraded or completely destroyed for the construction of fish and shrimp ponds.

Alabat enjoys a humid tropical climate with no dry season, but a very pronounced period of maximum rainfall from November to January. The island is home to the indigenous Alabat Agta people, whose language is critically endangered.

Inagta Alabat language
In 2010, UNESCO released its 3rd world volume of Endangered Languages in the World, where 3 critically endangered languages were in the Philippines. One of these languages in the Alabat Island Agta language which has an estimated speaker of 30 people in the year 2000. The language was classified as Critically Endangered, meaning the youngest speakers are grandparents and older, and they speak the language partially and infrequently and hardly pass the language to their children and grandchildren anymore. If the remaining 30 people do not pass their native language to the next generation of Alabat Agta people, their indigenous language will be extinct within a period of 1 to 2 decades.

The Alabat Agta people live only on the island of Alabat in Quezon province and a small area is Guinayangan in mainland Luzon. They are one of the original Negrito settlers in the entire Philippines. They belong to the Aeta people classification, but have distinct language and belief systems unique to their own culture and heritage.

The Secret Island Full of Twins
In November 2022, Nas_Daily posted a video on their facebook page referencing Alabat Island as "The Secret Island Full of Twins"

References

External links
 

Islands of Quezon